The 1967 New York Mets season was the sixth regular season for the Mets. They went 61–101 and finished 10th in the National League, 40½ games behind the NL pennant and World Series Champion St. Louis Cardinals. They were managed by Wes Westrum and Salty Parker. They played home games at Shea Stadium.

Offseason
 October 12, 1966: Lou Klimchock and Ernie Bowman were traded by the Mets to the Cleveland Indians for Floyd Weaver.
 November 29, 1966: Amos Otis was drafted by the Mets from the Boston Red Sox in the 1966 minor league draft.
 November 29, 1966: Ron Hunt and Jim Hickman were traded by the Mets to the Los Angeles Dodgers for Tommy Davis and Derrell Griffith.
 November 30, 1966: Ralph Terry was released by the Mets.
 December 6, 1966: Dennis Ribant and Gary Kolb were traded by the Mets to the Pittsburgh Pirates for Don Cardwell and Don Bosch.
 March 24, 1967: Derrell Griffith was traded by the Mets to the Houston Astros for Sandy Alomar Sr.

Regular season
Although the Mets took  a step back from the previous year, 1967 marked the debut of pitcher Tom Seaver. On July 19, at Shea Stadium, he recorded 10 strikeouts (The first of 62 games he would achieve that feat as a Mets uniform) in a 7-2 win over the Atlanta Braves. For the season he recorded 16 wins and 170 strikeouts, a Mets record. He had 18 complete games and a 2.76 ERA, also a Mets record. It all adds up to Seaver being named The National League Rookie of the Year, and a berth in the All-Star Game.

Season standings

Record vs. opponents

Notable transactions
 April 1, 1967: Eddie Bressoud, Danny Napoleon, and cash were traded by the Mets to the St. Louis Cardinals for Art Mahaffey, Jerry Buchek and Tony Martínez.
 April 2, 1967: Ralph Terry was signed as a free agent by the Mets.
 May 16, 1967: Ralph Terry was released by the Mets.
 June 6, 1967: Rich Hacker was drafted by the Mets in the 8th round of the 1967 Major League Baseball Draft (Secondary Phase).
 June 21, 1967: Al Luplow was acquired by the Pittsburgh Pirates from the New York Mets via waivers.
 July 22, 1967: Ken Boyer and a player to be named later were traded by the Mets to the Chicago White Sox for Bill Southworth and a player to be named later. The Mets completed their part of the deal by sending Sandy Alomar to the White Sox on August 15. The White Sox completed the deal by sending J. C. Martin to the Mets on November 27.
 July 24, 1967: Bob Shaw was purchased from the Mets by the Chicago Cubs.

Roster

Player stats

Batting

Starters by position
Note: Pos = Position; G = Games played; AB = At bats; H = Hits; Avg. = Batting average; HR = Home runs; RBI = Runs batted in

Other batters
Note: G = Games played; AB = At bats; H = Hits; Avg. = Batting average; HR = Home runs; RBI = Runs batted in

Pitching

Starting pitchers
Note: G = Games pitched; IP = Innings pitched; W = Wins; L = Losses; ERA = Earned run average; SO = Strikeouts

Other pitchers
Note: G = Games pitched; IP = Innings pitched; W = Wins; L = Losses; ERA = Earned run average; SO = Strikeouts

Relief pitchers
Note: G = Games pitched; W = Wins; L = Losses; SV = Saves; ERA = Earned run average; SO = Strikeouts

Farm system

LEAGUE CHAMPIONS: Durham

Notes

References

1967 New York Mets at Baseball Reference
1967 New York Mets team page at www.baseball-almanac.com

New York Mets seasons
New York Mets season
New York Mets
1960s in Queens